Ireland participated in the Eurovision Song Contest 2015 with the song "Playing with Numbers" written by Greg French and Molly Sterling. The song was performed by Molly Sterling. The Irish broadcaster Raidió Teilifís Éireann (RTÉ) organised the national final Eurosong 2015 in order to select the Irish entry for the 2015 contest in Vienna, Austria. Five songs faced the votes of five regional juries and a public televote, ultimately resulting in the selection of "Playing with Numbers" performed by Molly Sterling as the Irish Eurovision entry.

Ireland was drawn to compete in the second semi-final of the Eurovision Song Contest which took place on 21 May 2015. Performing during the show in position 2, "Playing with Numbers" was not announced among the top 10 entries of the second semi-final and therefore did not qualify to compete in the final. It was later revealed that Ireland placed twelfth out of the 17 participating countries in the semi-final with 35 points.

Background 

Prior to the 2015 contest, Ireland had participated in the Eurovision Song Contest forty-eight times since its first entry in 1965. Ireland has won the contest a record seven times in total. The country's first win came in 1970, with then-18-year-old Dana winning with "All Kinds of Everything". Ireland holds the record for being the only country to win the contest three times in a row (in 1992, 1993 and 1994), as well as having the only three-time winner (Johnny Logan, who won in 1980 as a singer, 1987 as a singer-songwriter, and again in 1992 as a songwriter). In 2011 and 2012, Jedward represented the nation for two consecutive years, managing to qualify to the final both times and achieve Ireland's highest position in the contest since 2000, placing eighth in 2011 with the song "Lipstick". However, in 2013, despite managing to qualify to the final, Ryan Dolan and his song "Only Love Survives" placed last in the final. The Irish entry in 2014, "Heartbeat" performed by Can-linn featuring Kasey Smith, failed to qualify to the final.

The Irish national broadcaster, Raidió Teilifís Éireann (RTÉ), broadcasts the event within Ireland and organises the selection process for the nation's entry. RTÉ confirmed their intentions to participate at the 2015 Eurovision Song Contest on 20 May 2014. From 2008 to 2014, RTÉ had set up the national final Eurosong to choose both the song and performer to compete at Eurovision for Ireland, with both the public and regional jury groups involved in the selection. For the 2015 Eurovision Song Contest, RTÉ announced on 13 October 2014 the organisation of Eurosong 2015 to choose the artist and song to represent Ireland at the contest. The competition format differed from the previous four years with a public entry submission process indicating the abandonment of the mentor system that involved five music professionals each selecting one entry for the competition.

Before Eurovision

Eurosong 2015 
Eurosong 2015 was the national final format developed by RTÉ in order to select Ireland's entry for the Eurovision Song Contest 2015. The competition was broadcast on RTÉ One as well as online via the broadcaster's official website rte.ie during a special edition of The Late Late Show held on 27 February 2015 and hosted by Ryan Tubridy.

Competing entries
On 13 October 2014, RTÉ opened a submission period where artists and composers were able to submit their entries for the competition until 31 October 2014. At the closing of the deadline, over 300 entries were received. The competing entries were selected through two phases involving two separate jury panels with members appointed by RTÉ; the first phase involved a jury panel reviewing all of the submissions and shortlisting 40 to 50 entries, while the second phase involved an alternate jury selecting the five finalists. The finalists were presented on 9 February 2015 on The Ray D'Arcy Show broadcast on RTÉ Radio 1.

Final
The national final featured commentary from a panel that consisted of composer Phil Coulter, singer and former contest winner Linda Martin, presenter Mairead Farrell and drag artist Panti Bliss. Guest performers included Niamh Kavanagh, Paul Harrington and Linda Martin. Following the 50/50 combination of votes from five regional juries and public televoting, "Playing with Numbers" performed by Molly Sterling was selected as the winner.

At Eurovision 

According to Eurovision rules, all nations with the exceptions of the host country and the "Big Five" (France, Germany, Italy, Spain and the United Kingdom) are required to qualify from one of two semi-finals in order to compete for the final; the top ten countries from each semi-final progress to the final. The European Broadcasting Union (EBU) split up the competing countries into six different pots based on voting patterns from previous contests, with countries with favourable voting histories put into the same pot. On 26 January 2015, a special allocation draw was held which placed each country into one of the two semi-finals, as well as which half of the show they would perform in. Ireland was placed into the second semi-final, to be held on 21 May 2015, and was scheduled to perform in the first half of the show.

Once all the competing songs for the 2015 contest had been released, the running order for the semi-finals was decided by the shows' producers rather than through another draw, so that similar songs were not placed next to each other. Ireland was set to perform in position 2, following the entry from Lithuania and before the entry from San Marino.

In Ireland, the semi-finals were broadcast on RTÉ2 and the final was broadcast on RTÉ One with commentary by Marty Whelan. The second semi-final and final were also broadcast via radio on RTÉ Radio 1 with commentary by Shay Byrne and Zbyszek Zalinski. The Irish spokesperson, who announced the Irish votes during the final, was Nicky Byrne.

Semi-final

Molly Sterling took part in technical rehearsals on 13 and 16 May, followed by dress rehearsals on 20 and 21 May. This included the jury final where professional juries of each country, responsible for 50 percent of each country's vote, watched and voted on the competing entries.

The stage show featured Molly Sterling performing seated at a piano and dressed in black, with a short leather sleeveless jacket and a lace top underneath. On stage she was joined by backing vocalists and an ensemble of musicians: a cellist, drummer and bass player. The background LED screens displayed scenic images of a sunlit forest. The musicians and backing vocalists that joined Sterling on stage were Jimmy Rainsford, Darren Sweeney, Naomi Clarke, Póilín Lynch and Jessica Supple.

At the end of the show, Ireland was not announced among the top 10 entries in the second semi-final and therefore failed to qualify to compete in the final. It was later revealed that Ireland placed twelfth in the semi-final, receiving a total of 35 points.

Voting
Voting during the three shows consisted of 50 percent public televoting and 50 percent from a jury deliberation. The jury consisted of five music industry professionals who were citizens of the country they represent, with their names published before the contest to ensure transparency. This jury was asked to judge each contestant based on: vocal capacity; the stage performance; the song's composition and originality; and the overall impression by the act. In addition, no member of a national jury could be related in any way to any of the competing acts in such a way that they cannot vote impartially and independently. The individual rankings of each jury member were released shortly after the grand final.

Following the release of the full split voting by the EBU after the conclusion of the competition, it was revealed that Ireland had placed sixteenth with the public televote and seventh with the jury vote in the second semi-final. In the public vote, Ireland scored 14 points, while with the jury vote, Ireland scored 84 points.

Below is a breakdown of points awarded to Ireland and awarded by Ireland in the second semi-final and grand final of the contest, and the breakdown of the jury voting and televoting conducted during the two shows:

Points awarded to Ireland

Points awarded by Ireland

Detailed voting results
The following five members comprised the Irish jury:
 Raymond Smyth (jury chairperson)composer, songwriter
 Bláthnaid Treacymusic/entertainment presenter
 Ryan Dolansinger, songwriter, represented Ireland in the 2013 contest
 Ann Harringtonsinger, songwriter
 Ray Harmansongwriter, composer, musician

References 

2015
Countries in the Eurovision Song Contest 2015
Eurovision
Eurovision